Please add names of notable painters with a Wikipedia page, in precise English alphabetical order, using U.S. spelling conventions. Country and regional names refer to where painters worked for long periods, not to personal allegiances.

Josef Jackerson (born 1936), Russian and Israeli painter
A. B. Jackson (died 1981), American painter
Francis Ernest Jackson (1872–1945), English painter, draftsman and poster designer
Robert Jacobsen (1912–1993), Danish sculptor and painter
Lambert Jacobsz (1598–1636), Dutch painter and preacher
Yvonne Jacquette (born 1934), American painter and print-maker
Jan Jahn (1739–1802), Czech painter and art historian
Božidar Jakac (1899–1989), Austro-Hungarian/Slovene painter, graphic artist and film-maker
Július Jakoby (1903–1985), Austro-Hungarian (Slovak)/Czechoslovak painter
Rihard Jakopič (1869–1943), Austro-Hungarian/Slovene painter
Matija Jama (1872–1947), Austro-Hungarian/Slovene painter
Shani Rhys James (born 1953), Welsh/English painter
Terrell James (born 1955), American painter
George Jamesone  (c. 1587 – 1644), Scottish portrait painter
Alfred Janes (1911–1999), Welsh/English artist
Jang Seung-eop (1843–1897), Korean painter
Louis Janmot (1814–1892), French painter and poet
Ruud Janssen (born 1959), Dutch painter and mail artist
Derek Jarman (1942–1994), English artist, stage designer and film director
James Jarvaise (born 1924), American painter
Eero Järnefelt (1863–1937), Finnish painter
Karl Jauslin (1842–1904), Swiss  painter
Alexej von Jawlensky (1864–1941), Russian painter
Ruth Jên (born 1964), Welsh artist and illustrator
Viktor de Jeney (1902–1996), Hungarian/American painter
William Jennys (1774–1859), American portrait painter
Alfred Jensen (1903–1981), Guatemalan abstract painter
Jeong Seon (정선, 1676–1759), Korean landscape painter
Walther Jervolino (1944–2012), Italian Surrealist painter
Ji Sheng, Chinese painter of the Ming Dynasty
Jiang Tingxi (蔣廷錫, 1669–1732), Chinese painter and editor
Jiao Bingzhen (焦秉貞, 1689–1726), Chinese painter and astronomer
Jin Nong (金農, 1687 – c. 1763–1764), Chinese painter and calligrapher
Ferenc Joachim (1882–1964), Hungarian portrait painter
Ted Joans (1928-2002), American surrealist, painter, poet and musician
Chantal Joffe (born 1969), English painter
Jóhannes Geir Jónsson (1927–2003), Icelandic painter
Jóhannes Sveinsson Kjarval (1885–1972), Icelandic painter
Augustus John (1878–1961), Welsh painter, draftsman and etcher.
Gwen John (1876–1939), Welsh painter
Jasper Johns (born 1930), American painter and print-maker
Mitchell Johnson (born 1964), American painter
Sargent Johnson (1888–1967), American painter, potter and sculptor
Allen Jones (born 1937), English painter, sculptor and lithographer
Aneurin Jones (1930–2017), Welsh painter and art teacher
Lois Mailou Jones (1905–1998), American painter
Ludolf Leendertsz de Jongh (1616–1679), Dutch painter
Johan Jongkind (1819–1891), Dutch painter and print-maker
Alexander Johnston (1816–1891), Scottish painter
Dorothy Johnstone (1892–1980), Scottish painter
Zoltán Joó (born 1956), Hungarian painter
Jacob Jordaens (1593–1678), Flemish painter
Asger Jorn (1914–1973), Danish painter, sculptor and author
Lily Delissa Joseph (1863–1940), English painter
Josetsu (如拙, fl. 1405–1423), Japanese suiboku artist 
Jean Jouvenet (1644–1717), French painter
Ju Chao (居巢, 1811–1865), Chinese painter
Ju Lian (居廉, 1828–1904), Chinese painter
Donald Judd (1928–1994), American artist
Jens Juel (1745–1802), Danish portrait painter
Júlíana Sveinsdóttir (1889–1966), Icelandic painter and textile artist
Grethe Jürgens (1899–1981), German painter
Gabrijel Jurkić (1886–1974), Bosnian artist

References
References can be found under each entry.

J